"Pink Girl With the Blues" is a single by alternative rock band Curve released on 2 September 1996. It was the first release after few years of hiatus and it reached #97 on UK singles chart. The second track, "Recovery", will be later included on their third studio album, Come Clean. All songs were mixed by Alan Moulder.

Track listing

CD
"Pink Girl With the Blues" – 4:17
"Recovery" – 4:34
"Black Delilah" – 4:54

7"
"Pink Girl With the Blues" – 4:17
"Recovery" – 4:34

Credits
 Written by Toni Halliday and Dean Garcia
 All tracks produced by Dean Garcia and Toni Halliday ad mixed by Alan Moulder
 Photography by Trevor Ray Hart
 Design by Alexander Hutchinson

References

1996 singles
Curve (band) songs
1996 songs
Songs written by Dean Garcia
Songs written by Toni Halliday